Matlama Football Club is the champion of Lesotho and the most successful club in the country. It is based in the city of Maseru, capital of the Lesotho.Matlama Football Club formed in 1932, is the most decorated team in Lesotho, having won the record 11 league championships. It is based in the capital city Maseru, its colors are Royal Blue and Manchester white (also in reverse on away games).The home ground of MATLAMA FC is Pitso ground, the venue where Lesotho gained its independence. The club is renowned for its entertaining style of play which is developed from its junior ranks from under12 to the senior team, the team boasts one of the oldest and most successful youth structure in the country so much that almost all the teams in the Premier league have the products of such an academy affectionally known as Bafana.

Achievements
Lesotho Premier League: 11
 1969*, 1974, 1977, 1978, 1982, 1986, 1988, 1992, 2003, 2010, 2019, 2022

Lesotho Cup: 6
 1976, 1979, 1980, 1987, 1992, 1994.

Performance in CAF competitions
CAF Champions League: 3 appearances
2004 – Preliminary Round
2011 – Preliminary Round
2020 – Preliminary Round

CAF Confederation Cup: 0 appearance

Current squad (2011–12)

External links
Team profile – soccerway.com

Lesotho Premier League clubs
1932 establishments in Basutoland